Andy Kwek Jun Liang (born 22 April 1999) is a Singaporean badminton player. He won a bronze medal for Singapore as part of the team at the 2022 Badminton Asia Team Championships and 2021 Southeast Asian Games. In 2022, Kwek won a title at the Swedish Open with his partner Danny Bawa Chrisnanta. Kwek and Chrisnanta also represented Singapore men's team at the 2022 Badminton Asia Team Championships and helped the team to secure a bronze medal.

Kwek competed in the 2022 Thomas Cup and the 2021 Southeast Asian Games. He was also part of the Singaporean mixed team squad that won bronze at the 2022 Commonwealth Games.

Achievements

BWF International Challenge/Series (2 titles, 1 runner-up) 
Men's doubles

Mixed doubles

  BWF International Challenge tournament
  BWF International Series tournament

BWF Junior International (1 title) 
Boys' doubles

  BWF Junior International Grand Prix tournament
  BWF Junior International Challenge tournament
  BWF Junior International Series tournament
  BWF Junior Future Series tournament

References

External links 
 
 
 Andy Kwek at Singapore Badminton Association

1999 births
Living people
Singaporean people of Chinese descent
Singapore Sports School alumni
Singaporean male badminton players
Badminton players at the 2022 Commonwealth Games
Commonwealth Games bronze medallists for Singapore
Commonwealth Games medallists in badminton
Competitors at the 2021 Southeast Asian Games
Southeast Asian Games bronze medalists for Singapore
Southeast Asian Games medalists in badminton
Medallists at the 2022 Commonwealth Games